The 2020–21 Widzew Łódź season was the club's first season back in I liga since promotion from II liga in 2020. They competed in the season's Polish Cup edition, where they were eliminated by Legia Warsaw, following the 0–1 defeat in the round of 32.

Players

Friendlies
In January 2021, Widzew Łódź faced Warta Poznań (1–3 defeat), Polonia Warsaw (2–1 victory) and Sokół Aleksandrów Łódzki (2–0 victory).

Transfers

Summer window 
 In: Michael Ameyaw (Bytovia Bytów), Karol Czubak (Bytovia Bytów), Merveille Fundambu (KTS Weszło Warsaw), Michał Grudniewski (Radomiak Radom), Jakub Kmita (reserve team), Dominik Kun (Sandecja Nowy Sącz), Mateusz Michalski (Radomiak Radom), Petar Mikulić (NK Croatia Zmijavci), Miłosz Mleczko (Lech Poznań, loan), Patryk Mucha (Górnik Polkowice), Konrad Reszka (reserve team), Damian Skrzeczkowski (reserve team), Patryk Stępiński (Warta Poznań)
 Out: Marcel Gąsior (Korona Kielce), Konrad Gutowski (Podbeskidzie Bielsko-Biała), Kornel Kordas (Korona Kielce), Christopher Mandiangu (Vllaznia Shkodër), Kamil Piskorski (Pomorzanin Toruń), Adam Radwański (Bruk-Bet Termalica Nieciecza), Łukasz Turzyniecki (Zagłębie Sosnowiec), Patryk Wolański (Sokół Lutomiersk), Rafał Wolsztyński (Arka Gdynia), Hubert Wołąkiewicz (free agent)

Winter window 
 In: Caique Dias da Cruz (Olimpia Grudziądz), Kacper Gach (Podbeskidzie Bielsko-Biała), Marek Hanousek (MFK Karviná), Vjačeslavs Kudrjavcevs (Stomil Olsztyn), Piotr Samiec-Talar (Śląsk Wrocław), Paweł Tomczyk (Stal Mielec), Jakub Wrąbel (Wisła Płock)
 Out: Daniel Mąka (reserve team), Henrik Ojamaa (Flora Tallinn), Wojciech Pawłowski (reserve team), Marcel Pięczek (Puszcza Niepołomice), Robert Prochownik (Sandecja Nowy Sącz)

Competitions

I liga

Standings

Matches

Polish Cup

References

Widzew Łódź
Widzew Łódź